The  is an electric multiple unit (EMU) train type operated by the private railway operator Sanyo Electric Railway in Japan since June 1997.

Design
The trains are based on the earlier 5000 series design, and incorporate improvements to reduce noise and facilitate maintenance.

Formation
, two 6-car sets were in service, formed as follows with three motored "M" cars per set.

The M1 and M3 cars are each fitted with two scissors-type pantographs.

Interior
Passenger accommodation consists of transverse seating arranged 2+1 abreast, with seat backs that can be flipped over automatically to face the direction of travel.

References

Electric multiple units of Japan
Train-related introductions in 1997
1500 V DC multiple units of Japan
Kawasaki multiple units